Nightfall or night fall may refer to:

Time of day
 Sunset or sundown, the daily disappearance of the Sun below the western half of the horizon
 Twilight, the period during which the Sun is at most 18° below the horizon and when the sky is illuminated by indirect sunlight scattered in the upper atmosphere
 Nautical dusk, the last stage of twilight in the evening before night

Film 
 Nightfall (1956 film), an American film noir by Jacques Tourneur
 Nightfall (1988 film), a film starring David Birney
 Nightfall (1999 film), a film starring Jeff Rector
 Nightfall (1999 German film), a film by Fred Kelemen
 Nightfall (2000 film), a film starring Ashish Vidyarthi
 Nightfall (2012 film), a Hong Kong crime thriller by Chow Hin-yeung

Gaming 
 Nightfall (video game), the first real-time 3D adventure game, released in 1998
 Nightfall Games, a UK role-playing game publishing company
 Guild Wars Nightfall, a 2006 computer game in the Guild Wars series
 Nightfall, a deck-building card game by Alderac Entertainment Group
 Nightfall: Escape, a first-person survival horror game by Zeenoh, released in 2016

Literature

Stories and novels 
 "Nightfall" (Asimov novelette and novel), a 1941 science fiction story by Isaac Asimov, and a 1990 adapted novel by Asimov and Robert Silverberg
 Nightfall and Other Stories, a 1969 collection of short stories by Asimov
 Night Fall (novel), a 2004 novel by Nelson DeMille
 Nightfall, a novel by Will Elliott
 Nightfall, a 1947 novel by David Goodis
 Nightfall, a two-novel fantasy series by Mickey Zucker Reichert
 The Return: Nightfall, a 2009 novel by L. J. Smith
 "Nightfall", a 1947 short story by Arthur C. Clarke included in The Collected Stories of Arthur C. Clarke (2001)
 "Nightfall", a 2003 short story incorporated into the 2005 Manfred Macx novel Accelerando by Charles Stross

Comics 
 Nightfall (comics), a DC Comics supervillain
 Nightfall: The Black Chronicles, a 1999–2000 comic book mini-series published by Wildstorm/Homage Comics
 Nightfall, a graphic novel by Scott O. Brown

Music 
 Nightfall (band), a Greek heavy metal band
 Nightfall (Candlemass album), 1987
 Nightfall (Louis Hayes album), 1991
 Nightfall (Charlie Haden album), 2004
 Nightfall (Little Big Town album), 2020
 "Nightfall", a song by Amorphis from Tuonela
 "Nightfall", a song by Blind Guardian from Nightfall in Middle-Earth
 "Nightfall", a song by Stratovarius from Fourth Dimension
 "Nightfall", a song by Xandria from Sacrificium
 "Nightfall" (Interlude), a song by Tinashe from Aquarius
 "Nightfalls", a song by Keith Urban

Radio and television 
 Nightfall (radio series), a 1980–1983 Canadian supernatural/horror series
 "Night Fall" (Yin-Yang-Yo!), an episode of the TV series Yin-Yang-Yo!
 "Nightfall", an episode of the radio program Dimension X, based on the Isaac Asimov story (see above)
 Operation Nightfall, a fictional operation in the first season of the TV series 24
 Halo: Nightfall, a 2014 series set in the Halo universe

Other 

 Nightfall meteorite, the colloquial name for the El Ali meteorite
 Nocturnal emission, a spontaneous orgasm during sleep that includes ejaculation for a male, or vaginal wetness or an orgasm (or both) for a female.

See also 
 The Fall of Night (TV episode) 1995 episode of Babylon 5
 Against the Fall of Night (novel) 1948 novel by Arthur C. Clarke
 The City and the Stars (novel) 1956 novel by Arthur C. Clarke, sometimes referred to as some variation of "fall of night"
 Beyond the Fall of Night (novel) 1990 novel by Gregory Benford, based on the work of Arthur C. Clakre
 Knightfall (disambiguation)